Darwinia fascicularis is shrub in the myrtle family and is endemic to areas near Sydney. A small shrub with aromatic foliage and white flowers, turning red as they mature. Nectar feeding birds are attracted to its flowers as a food source.

Description
The leaves are crowded, arranged opposite or whorled on spreading branches. The flowers resemble a pin-cushion appearing in clusters of 4-20 flowers at the end of branches turning red as they age. The sepals are usually toothed and triangular and about half the length of the petals. Flowering occurs from June to September.

Taxonomy and naming
Darwinia fascicularis was first formally described by Edward Rudge in 1816 and published in Transactions of the Linnean Society of London. The specific epithet (fascicularis) means "resembling a small bundle".

Two subspecies are recognised by the Australian Plant Census. 
Darwinia fascicularis subsp. oligantha was first formally described in 1962 by Barbara Briggs and published in Contributions from the New South Wales National Herbarium. This species usually has only 4 flowers, rarely 2 or 6 and only appearing in pairs. The branches will take root when in contact with the soil. Leaves are less crowded and a darker green. It grows at higher altitudes in the Blue Mountains  to Wentworth Falls in New South Wales in heath or on shallow sandstone soils. The epithet (oligantha) means "few-flowered", referring to the small number of flowers in each inflorescence.
The branches do not take root when in contact with the soil. It grows from Gosford in the Central Coast to Bulli near Wollongong within  of the coast. Grows in exposed situations on the edge of sandstone ridges, mostly in heathland or dry sclerophyll scrub below .

Distribution and habitat
Darwinia fascicularis grows from as far north as Gosford in the Central Coast to Bulli near Wollongong. The habitat is poor sandy soils, in dry eucalyptus forest or heathlands in high rainfall areas.

Uses in horticulture
Darwinia fascicularis is a hardy species, for an open sunny situation in well-drained soil.  Several native birds are attracted to this species of Darwinia as a source of nectar they include  the New Holland honeyeater (Phylidonyris novaehollandiae), tawny-crowned honeyeater (Gliciphila melanops) and eastern spinebill (Acanthorhynchus tenuirostris). This genus believed to be predominantly pollinated by birds.

References

fascicularis
Flora of New South Wales
Plants described in 1816
Taxa named by Edward Rudge